A block-nested loop (BNL) is an algorithm used to join two relations in a relational database.

Suppose .

The block nested loop join algorithm improves on the simple nested loop join by only scanning  once for every group of  tuples. For example, one variant of the block nested loop join reads an entire page of  tuples into memory and loads them into a hash table. This reduces the number of scans of  that are necessary.

 algorithm block_nested_loop_join is
     for each page pr in R do
         for each page ps in S do
             for each tuple r in pr do
                 for each tuple s in ps do
                     if r and s satisfy the join condition then
                         yield tuple <r,s>

This further reduces the number of scans of  that are necessary. In fact, this algorithm is essentially a special-case of the classic hash join algorithm.

Note
that block nested loop runs in  I/Os if  fits in the available internal memory.

References

Join algorithms